In Greek mythology, Ampyx (Ancient Greek: Ἄμπυξ) or Ampycus (Ἄμπυκος Ampykos means 'woman's diadem, frontlet') was the name of the following figures:

 Ampyx, also called Ampycus or Ampyce was a seer, the son of Elatus and possibly of Hippeia from Titaresia. He fathered Mopsus with the nymph Chloris or Aregonis. His son Mopsus joined the Argonauts after he was slain.
 Ampyx, father of the seer Idmon in some texts. Otherwise, Idmon was called the son of Abas or the god Apollo by Antianeira. Not to be confused with the above-mentioned Ampyx who was the father of another seer, Mopsus.
 Ampyx or Ampycus, an Ethiopian priest of Demeter (Ceres). He appears in Ovid's Metamorphoses and was slain by Phineus during a fight between Phineus and Perseus (see Boast of Cassiopeia), just before Phineus was turned to stone.
 Ampyx or Amycus, son of Opinion, was one of the Lapiths who fought the centaurs at Pirithous's wedding. Appears in Ovid's Metamorphoses.
 Ampyx, son of Pelias, descendant of King Amyclas of Laconia. Through his son Areus, Ampyx became the ancestor of Patreus who founded Patrae.

Other use 
 In hair care, an ampyx (ἄμπυχ) is a headband, often made of metal.

Notes

References 

 Gaius Julius Hyginus, Fabulae from The Myths of Hyginus translated and edited by Mary Grant. University of Kansas Publications in Humanistic Studies. Online version at the Topos Text Project.
 Hesiod, Shield of Heracles from The Homeric Hymns and Homerica with an English Translation by Hugh G. Evelyn-White, Cambridge, MA.,Harvard University Press; London, William Heinemann Ltd. 1914. Online version at the Perseus Digital Library. Greek text available from the same website.
 The Orphic Argonautica, translated by Jason Colavito. © Copyright 2011. Online version at the Topos Text Project.
Pausanias, Description of Greece with an English Translation by W.H.S. Jones, Litt.D., and H.A. Ormerod, M.A., in 4 Volumes. Cambridge, MA, Harvard University Press; London, William Heinemann Ltd. 1918. Online version at the Perseus Digital Library
 Pausanias, Graeciae Descriptio. 3 vols. Leipzig, Teubner. 1903.  Greek text available at the Perseus Digital Library.
 Publius Ovidius Naso, Metamorphoses translated by Brookes More (1859-1942). Boston, Cornhill Publishing Co. 1922. Online version at the Perseus Digital Library.
 Publius Ovidius Naso, Metamorphoses. Hugo Magnus. Gotha (Germany). Friedr. Andr. Perthes. 1892. Latin text available at the Perseus Digital Library.

Mythological Greek seers
Lapiths in Greek mythology
Laconian mythology